Crypt of the Devil is the eleventh studio album by the American death metal band Six Feet Under. It was released on May 15, 2015, on Metal Blade Records. The album features Phil Hall on guitar and bass, Josh Hall on drums and Brandon Ellis on lead guitar of the band Cannabis Corpse as the studio lineup.

Track listing 
All lyrics written by Chris Barnes. All music written by Phil Hall.

Charts

Personnel

Six Feet Under 
Chris Barnes – vocals

Session members 
 Brandon Ellis – lead guitar
 Phil Hall – rhythm guitar, bass
 Josh Hall – drums

Additional musicians 
 Ray Suhy – guitar solo on "Open Coffin Orgy"
 Rebecca Scammon – guitar solo on "Break the Cross in Half"

Miscellaneous staff 
 Brian Armes – graphic design
 Rob Caldwell – mixing
 Alan Douches – mastering
 Mike Hrubovcak – cover art
 Carson Lehman – vocal engineering

References 

2015 albums
Six Feet Under (band) albums
Metal Blade Records albums